Matthew Kirtley  (6 February 181324 May 1873) was born at Tanfield, Durham. He was an important early locomotive engineer.

Career

Early years
At the age of thirteen he began work on the Stockton and Darlington Railway; he was fireman on the Liverpool and Manchester Railway, and was present at its opening. Eventually he became a driver on the London and Birmingham Railway (L&BR). He is believed to have driven the first L&BR train (and the first main line train) to enter London.

Midland Railway

In 1839 he was appointed first a locomotive foreman, and then in 1841 Locomotive Superintendent of the Birmingham and Derby Junction Railway. When that railway became one of the constituents of the Midland Railway, he became the Midland's Locomotive Superintendent. He was there Chief Mechanical Engineer from 1844 until he died in 1873. Hundreds of locomotives to his design existed, many of which were to last into the days of the London, Midland and Scottish Railway, some fifty years later.

Family
Matthew Kirtley's brother Thomas Kirtley was also a locomotive engineer (on the London, Brighton and South Coast Railway (1847)) as was his nephew, William Kirtley, who served as locomotive superintendent on the London, Chatham and Dover Railway, 1874-1898.

Legacy
The Midland Railway Trust’s collection of locomotives, carriages and wagon is housed in what is now named the Matthew Kirtley Building.

References

External links
 http://www.steamindex.com/people/midland.htm

English mechanical engineers
English railway mechanical engineers
Locomotive builders and designers
Midland Railway people
1813 births
1873 deaths
People from Tanfield, County Durham